Two ships of the United States Navy have been named Albuquerque, after the city of Albuquerque, New Mexico.

 , was a patrol frigate commissioned in 1943, loaned to the Soviet Union in August 1945 and returned 1949, then loaned to Japan in 1953.
 , was a  nuclear attack submarine commissioned in 1983 and decommissioned in 2017.

Sources

United States Navy ship names